Francis Joseph "Frank" D'Agostino (April 8, 1934 – September 28, 1997) was an American football player.  D'Agostino attended Auburn University and played college football at the tackle position for the Auburn Tigers football team. He was selected by the Associated Press and the American Football Coaches Association as a first-team player on their respective 1955 College Football All-America Teams.  He was selected by the Philadelphia Eagles in the second round (16th overall pick) of the 1956 NFL Draft.  He appeared in 12 games for the Eagles during the 1956 NFL season.  In 1960, D'Agostino played in the new American Football League, appearing in two games for the New York Titans (later renamed the New York Jets) during the 1960 AFL season.

References

1934 births
1997 deaths
American football tackles
American football guards
Auburn Tigers football players
Players of American football from Philadelphia
Philadelphia Eagles players
New York Titans (AFL) players